The 1993–94 season of the Bayernliga, the third tier of the German football league system in the state of Bavaria at the time, was the 49th season of the league. It was the last season of the league at the third tier of the league system as, from 1994 onward, it slipped to the fourth tier because of the introduction of the Regionalliga as a new tier between 2. Bundesliga and Oberliga.

Overview
The league champions, FC Augsburg, qualified for the promotion round to the 2. Bundesliga where the club was however unsuccessful in winning promotion. Augsburg qualified for the new Regionalliga Süd instead. It was the fourth Bayernliga title for Augsburg, having previously won the league in 1972–73, 1979–80 and 1981–82.

Alongside Augsburg five other clubs from the Bayernliga qualified for the new Regionalliga, SpVgg Fürth and TSV Vestenbergsgreuth who would merge In 1996, SV Lohhof, SpVgg Unterhaching and the reserve team of FC Bayern Munich. Qualifying was determined on a points system covering the previous three seasons rather than just 1993–94.

Runners-up SV Lohhof also qualified for the German amateur championship, where it came last in the southern group and was knocked-out.

Because of the departure of six clubs to the new Regionalliga only one team was relegated from the league, last placed SpVgg Plattling. For Plattling, who had first entered the league in 1950 and spend 25 seasons at this level all up, it was the end of an era as the club did not return to the Bayernliga after 1994. The 16th placed team, SSV Jahn Regensburg successfully defended its league place in the relegation play-off.

Christian Radelmaier of FC Augsburg was the top scorer of the league with 22 goals.

Table
The 1993–94 season saw five new clubs in the league, Wacker Burghausen, VfB Helmbrechts, FC Gundelfingen and SpVgg Plattling, all promoted from the Landesliga Bayern, while SpVgg Unterhaching had been relegated from the 2. Bundesliga to the league.					

For both FC Gundelfingen and Wacker Burghausen it was the first time to play in the Bayernliga while SpVgg Plattling had returned after a single seasons absence, having been relegated in 1992, and VfB Helmbrechts the season before. SpVgg Unterhaching, the 1991–92 Bayernliga champions, returned to the league after just a single season in the 2. Bundesliga.

2. Bundesliga promotion round
In Group 3 the champions of the Oberliga Nordrhein, Oberliga Westfalen and the Bayernliga as well as the runners-up of the Oberliga Nord competed for one promotion spot to the 2. Bundesliga:

Regionalliga qualifying
Six clubs from the Bayernliga qualified for the new Regionalliga, based on a points system that took the last three seasons into account. For a first-place finish 17 points were awarded, for every place below one point less with the 17th placed team receiving just one point. Points were doubled for the 1992–93 season and tripled for the 1993–94 season. Teams from above the Bayernliga in any of these seasons received maximum points for that year, resulting in SpVgg Unterhaching receiving 34 points for playing in the 2. Bundesliga in 1992–93. The points table:

Bayernliga promotion round
Because of the departure of six clubs to the Regionalliga promoted to the Bayernliga was expanded in 1993–94 with all Landesliga champions and runners-up directly promoted. Additionally, the 16th placed Bayernliga team had to face the third placed teams of the three Landesligas for three more places in the Bayernliga, with only the loser of the second round, SpVgg Weiden missing out on a Bayernliga place.

References

Sources

External links 
 Official website  of the Bavarian Football Association 

1993-94
3
1993–94 in European third tier association football leagues